David Bruton may refer to:

 David Bruton (American football) (born 1987), American football safety and special teams player
 Dave Bruton (footballer) (born 1952), English former footballer

See also
 David Burton (disambiguation)